Avram Hershko (born December 31, 1937) is a Hungarian-Israeli biochemist who received the Nobel Prize in Chemistry in 2004.

Biography
He was born Herskó Ferenc in Karcag, Hungary, the son of Shoshana/Margit 'Manci' (née Wulc) and Moshe Hershko, both teachers.
During the Second World War, his father was forced into labor service in the Hungarian army and then taken as a prisoner by the Soviet Army. For years, Avram's family didn't known anything about what had happened to his father. Avram, his mother and older brother were put in a ghetto in Szolnok. During the final days of the ghetto, most Jews were sent to be murdered in Auschwitz, but Avram and his family managed to board trains that took them to a concentration camp in Austria, where they were forced into labor until the end of the war. Avram and his mother survived the war and returned to their home. His father returned as well, 4 years after they had last seen him.

Hershko and his family emigrated to Israel in 1950 and settled in Jerusalem. He received his MD in 1965 and his PhD in 1969 from the Hebrew University of Jerusalem-Hadassah Medical Center.  He was a postdoctoral scholar at the University of California, San Francisco. He is currently a Distinguished Professor at the Rappaport Faculty of Medicine at the Technion in Haifa and a Distinguished Adjunct Professor at the New York University Grossman School of Medicine.

Along with Aaron Ciechanover and Irwin Rose, he was awarded the 2004 Nobel Prize in Chemistry for the discovery of ubiquitin-mediated protein degradation. The ubiquitin-proteasome system has a critical role in maintaining the homeostasis of cells and is believed to be involved in the development and progression of diseases such as cancer, muscular and neurological diseases, and immune and inflammatory responses.

His contributions to science directly helped cure one of his long-time friends of cancer.

Honours and awards
1987 – Weizmann Prize for Sciences
1994 – Israel Prize in Biochemistry
1999 – Canada Gairdner International Award (with Alexander Varshavsky)
2000 – Albert Lasker Award for Basic Medical Research (with Aaron Ciechanover and Varshavsky)
2000 – Alfred P. Sloan Jr. Prize (with Varshavsky)
2000 – Member, Israel Academy of Sciences and Humanities
2001 – Louisa Gross Horwitz Prize from Columbia University (with Varshavsky)
2001 – Massry Prize from the Keck School of Medicine of USC, University of Southern California (with Varshavsky)
2001 – Wolf Prize in Medicine (with Varshavsky) for "the discovery of the ubiquitin system of intracellular protein degradation and the crucial functions of this system in cellular regulation."
2002 – The EMET Prize for Art, Science and Culture in the category of Life Sciences (with Ciechanover and Leo Sachs)
2002 – E.B. Wilson Medal (with Varshavsky)
2003 – Foreign Associate, National Academy of Sciences, USA
2004 – Nobel Prize in Chemistry for his discovery with Ciechanover and Irwin Rose, of ubiquitin-mediated protein degradation
2005 – Elected to the American Philosophical Society

Publications

Involvement with biotechnology
Professor Hershko serves on the Scientific Advisory Board of Oramed Pharmaceuticals.

See also

 List of Israel Prize recipients
 List of Israeli Nobel laureates
 List of Jewish Nobel laureates
 Science and technology in Israel

References

External links

  including the Nobel Lecture The Ubiquitin System for Protein Degradation and some of its Roles in the Control of the Cell Division Cycle
 Website at the Technion
Avram Hershko's Short Talk: "Lessons from My Life in Science"
 "Hungarian" Nobel Prize winners Crooked Timber
 Avram Hershko Jewish Virtual Library
 Ubiquitin-Mediated Protein Degradation: From the lab to the bedside Dan Hersko
 The Official Site of Louisa Gross Horwitz Prize

1937 births
Living people
Nobel laureates in Chemistry
Hungarian Nobel laureates
Israeli Nobel laureates
The Hebrew University-Hadassah Medical School alumni
Hungarian biochemists
Hungarian emigrants to Israel
Hungarian Jews
Israel Prize in biochemistry recipients
EMET Prize recipients in the Life Sciences
Israeli biochemists
Israeli Jews
Members of the European Molecular Biology Organization
Members of the Israel Academy of Sciences and Humanities
Foreign associates of the National Academy of Sciences
Foreign members of the Chinese Academy of Sciences
People from Haifa
People from Karcag
Academic staff of Technion – Israel Institute of Technology
Wolf Prize in Medicine laureates
Recipients of the Albert Lasker Award for Basic Medical Research
Massry Prize recipients
Schleiden Medal recipients
Jewish concentration camp survivors
Israeli people of Hungarian-Jewish descent
Members of the American Philosophical Society
New York University faculty
University of California, San Francisco alumni